The 3rd Shanghai International Film Festival was held between October 24 and December 2, 1997. The Film Festival was divided into four activities:
Golden Cup International Film Competition
International Film Panorama
International Film and TV Market
Retrospectives with Seminar

British film The Woodlanders won the Golden Goblet for best film.

Jury
Shi Fangyu (China)
Keiko Matsuzaka (Japan)
Im Kwon-taek (Korea)
Elem Klimov (Russia)
Mark Rydell (United States)
István Szabó (Hungary)
Ng See-Yuen (Hong Kong)

In competition

Awards

Golden Goblet
Best Film - The Woodlanders (dir. Phil Agland, United Kingdom)
Best Director - Phil Agland for The Woodlanders (United Kingdom)
Best Actor - Michel Piccoli for Traveling Companion (Italy)
Best Actress - Pan Yu for Live at Peace (China)

Special Jury Award
Mendel (dir. Alexander Rosler, Norway)
Live in Peace (dir. Hu Binliu)

External links
Archives of the Shanghai International Film Festival
3rd SIFF  at the Internet Movie Database

Shanghai
Shanghai
Shanghai International Film Festival
1990s in Shanghai